Pumacocha (possibly from Quechua puma cougar, puma, qucha lake,) is a lake in Peru located in the Junín Region, Yauli Province, Yauli District. Pumacocha lies northwest of a lake named Huallacocha (possibly from in Quechua Wallaqucha) and southwest of the town of Yauli.

The Pumacocha dam was completed in 1942. It is operated by Centromín Perú.

See also
List of lakes in Peru

References

Lakes of Peru
Lakes of Junín Region
Dams in Peru
Buildings and structures in Junín Region